The 1998 Wolverhampton Metropolitan Borough Council election took place on 7 May 1998 to elect members of Wolverhampton Metropolitan Borough Council in the West Midlands, England. One third of the council was up for election and the Labour Party kept overall control of the council.

After the election, the composition of the council was:
Labour 44
Conservative 14
Liberal Democrat 2

Campaign
20 of the 60 seats on the council were up for election with Labour defending 15, the Conservatives 4 and the Liberal Democrats 1. All three parties leaders on the council were defending their seats in the election, Labour's Norman Davies, Conservative Jim Carpenter and the Liberal Democrats Malcolm Gwynnett. However Labour were guaranteed to remain in control of the council as they had 46 councillors before the election, compared to 12 Conservatives and 2 Liberal Democrats. As well as the 3 main parties the only other candidates were 3 Liberals and 2 Labour Independents.

The Conservative national leader William Hague attacked the Labour council as he said they lowered the education budget while setting one of the highest metropolitan council taxes in the country. However Labour's council leader joined with other local leaders to make a joint response and said that when the Conservatives were in control taxes in Wolverhampton had gone up by 57%.

Election Result
Labour retained control of the council after the election with a majority of 28, but lost 2 seats to the Conservatives in Bushbury and Park wards. Overall turnout in the election was 29.95%, but reached a low of only 18% in Low Hill.

Ward results

References

1998
1998 English local elections
1990s in the West Midlands (county)